Ken Flach and Robert Seguso were the defending champions but lost in the first round to Tim Pawsat and Laurie Warder.

Darren Cahill and Mark Kratzmann won in the final 7–6, 6–3 against Pawsat and Warder.

Seeds

Draw

Finals

Top half

Bottom half

External links
1989 Stella Artois Championships Doubles Draw

Doubles